Joseph Julien Jean-Pierre Côté  (January 9, 1926 – July 10, 2002) was a Canadian parliamentarian and the 23rd Lieutenant Governor of Quebec.

Early life
Born in Montreal, Quebec, the son of Émile Côté and Cédia Roy, he studied to be a dental technician at the École technique de denturologie in Montreal.

Member of Parliament
In the 1963 federal elections, he was elected in the riding of Longueuil as the Liberal candidate. He was re-elected in 1965 and 1968. He held quite a few ministerial positions including Postmaster General, Minister of National Revenue, Minister without Portfolio, and Minister of Communications (Acting). He did not run for re-election in 1972.

Senate of Canada
In 1972, he was appointed to the senate representing the senatorial division of Kennebec, Quebec. He resigned in 1978.

Lieutenant Governor of Quebec
In 1978, he was appointed Lieutenant Governor of Quebec. He served until 1984.

Family
On July 31, 1948, he married Marie Anne Germaine Tremblay (17 September 1922 - 31 January 2011). They had eight children together: Andrée, Gilbert, Danielle, Robert, Paul, Hélène, Jocelyne, Isabelle.

Honours
 He was sworn in as a Member of the Queen's Privy Council for Canada on 18 December 1965. This gave him the right to the honorific prefix "The Honourable" and the post nominal letters "PC" for life.
 In 1992, he was made an Officer of the Order of Canada giving him the post nominal letters "OC".
In 2002 he was given the Canadian version of the Queen Elizabeth II Golden Jubilee Medal.

Artist

He was also an accomplished landscape painter.  His paintings are quite sought after.

References

External links
 
 The Canadian Encyclopedia - Jean-Pierre Côté

1926 births
2002 deaths
Artists from Montreal
Canadian landscape painters
Canadian senators from Quebec
French Quebecers
Liberal Party of Canada MPs
Liberal Party of Canada senators
Lieutenant Governors of Quebec
Members of the House of Commons of Canada from Quebec
Members of the King's Privy Council for Canada
Officers of the Order of Canada
People from Longueuil
Politicians from Montreal
Postmasters General of Canada